On 12 August 2018, a mass shooting happened in the Manchester neighbourhood of Moss Side. It was the first mass shooting in the UK since the Cumbria shootings in 2010.  The weapon used was believed by Greater Manchester Police to be a shotgun. There were no fatalities.

Background
Moss Side was hosting the Manchester Caribbean Carnival over the weekend, with over 16,000 attendees on the Saturday. The annual event attracted more participants than usual as it marked the 70th anniversary of the Windrush generation. Moss Side is described by a resident as a "volatile" inner-city area, with Sky News adding that it has "numerous gang territories and has long had problems connected with drugs and gun violence", though a local DJ interviewed about the incident said that "[i]t seemed like there was a general understanding over the last few years that everyone would just behave themselves" in Moss Side.

Mass shootings are rare in the UK, with the most recent previous being a spree shooting in Cumbria in 2010, and the one before a school shooting in Dunblane in 1996. The DJ interviewed said he had been alerted to the incident and come down because he wanted to "see this thing, because 10 people is a major thing in Manchester." The most previous major violent crime in Manchester had been the Manchester Arena bombing in 2017, in which 22 people were killed.

Incident
Reports say shots were fired at 02:25 in the morning of Sunday, 12 August 2018, on Claremont Road, a street that runs for two miles through Moss Side. Claremont Road is near Alexandra Park, the location of the festival, but the attack is seen as unrelated to the main festival, "just a street party". Police arrived on the scene "within a minute" according to sources, but a witness said that it was "quite a long time [before the police arrived] considering somebody had been shot", mentioning that there was "informal security" on the scene, and that "the ambulance was [probably] waiting for armed police [...] and then eventually the police did turn up".

When the police arrived, they reported "several hundred" people in the area, with Chief Superintendent Wasim Chaudhry describing the street as "distressing". One witness to the incident said that after he heard the first gunshot he thought it was "a balloon", similar to the initial reports of the arena bombing the year before, but then "heard two more and [...] went behind a wall" when he realised something dangerous was happening.

The police believe that a shotgun loaded with pellets was used, and treated the incident as an attempted mass murder.

Aftermath
Twelve people were injured, with ten hospitalised, and one of these in serious condition. Nine of those injuries were said to be gunshot pellet wounds, the other was a man's broken leg. Two of the injured were children, one aged 12 and the other a teenager. Later in the day, Detective Superintendent Debbie Dooley confirmed that "most [of the injuries] do not appear to be life-threatening at this time". Several people remained in hospital overnight.

On 11 September two men, aged 24 and 30, were arrested on suspicion of attempted murder and on suspicion of possession of a firearm.

See also
2020 Moss Side shooting

References

2018 mass shootings in Europe
2010s crimes in Manchester
2010s mass shootings in the United Kingdom
Attacks in the United Kingdom in 2018
August 2018 crimes in Europe
August 2018 events in the United Kingdom
Mass shootings in England
Non-fatal shootings
Violence in Manchester